Ayatollah Mohsen Heidari AleKasir (Persian:محسن حیدری آل کثیر) is an Iranian Shia Islamic cleric who was born in 1957 in a middle class rural family in the village of Hor Riyahi Abadi where is located near to Shush in Khuzestan province.  He is one of Khuzestan current members in Assembly of Experts.

Biography 
Mohsen Heidari Alekasir started his education in Ahwaz seminary, and continued his education in Qom since 1980. He is also one of the current temporary Imams-Jom’ah (the Imams of Friday prayer) of Ahwaz as the capital of Khuzestan province.

Compilations
Ayatollah Heidari AleKasir has the scholarly records of research and teaching at seminary and university. He has several compilations, among:

 Qaedeh la Zarar
 Hezb Alawi and Hezb Umavi
 Welayat al-Faqih Tarikhha wa Mabaniha
 Al-Erhab wal-Unf Ala Dhou al-Quran wa-Sunnah.

Teachers
Mohsen Heidari Alekasir had/has prominent teachers who often are regarded as famous Ayatollahs such as:

 Ayatollah Sobhani,
 Ayatollah Makarem Shirazi,
 Ayatollah Fazil-Lankarani,
 Ayatollah Wahid Khorasani
and other well-known Ayatollahs, among Mirza Jawad Tabrizi, Hashemi Shahroodi, Mousavi Jazayeri, Javadi Amoli, Mesbah Yazdi, Mazaheri, Ma’refat, Khaz’ali and so on. Meanwhile, according to his statement, Ayatollah Sobhani and َAyatollah Mousavi Jazayeri have writtenly confirmed his Ijtihad and power on Inference of religious Ahkam (rulings) in written.

Viewpoints
As some examples of diverse viewpoints of Ayatollah Heidari, he considers making park(s) for women as the best way to provide moral security in the society; additionally, he believes that gender segregation is regarded as the most appropriate gift for women. Meanwhile, several times, he has criticized the related officials due to transferring the water of Karun river to other places which can be led into diverse problems for Khuzestan and other provinces, because it is the serious demand of the Khuzestan people and its authorities that the water of Karun should not be transferred, since the reduction of its water is caused of different problems.

References

Members of the Assembly of Experts
1957 births
People from Khuzestan Province
Living people
Iranian ayatollahs
Ahwazi Arabs
Ayatollahs